The London Studio Centre, in North Finchley, London, is a British dance and theatre school providing courses in classical ballet, contemporary dance, jazz dance, and musical theatre. It is accredited by the Council for Dance, Drama and Musical Theatre.

History
The London Studio Centre was founded in 1978 by Bridget Espinosa, artistic director of the Bush Davies Ballet School and previously of the Elmhurst Ballet School. The Espinosa family is descended from the dancer Léon Espinosa (1825–1903).

Elizabeth Hurley, who later became one of the school's most famous students, was expelled for non-attendance in 1986.

From 1995, Bachelor of Arts degrees were awarded to students by Middlesex University, and then in 2004 this was replaced by an affiliation for the same purpose with the University of the Arts London, but with effect from 2013 the Middlesex University partnership was reinstated.

The school was based at 42-50 York Way, Kings Cross, London, from 1986 to 2012, when it moved to occupy rooms and share other facilities in the Artsdepot building in North Finchley, its present home.

Facilities
The London Studio Centre's facilities at artsdepot include a lecture room, ten dance studios, a library, and other rooms for singing and drama. It also has shared use of the on-site Pentland Theatre and Studio Theatre.

The school has a long-standing relationship with Chester House, Muswell Hill, which provides some accommodation for students.

Notable alumni

 Lucy Alexander, television presenter 
 Tamsier Joof Aviance, choreographer and historian 
 Natricia Bernard, choreographer
 Rafael Bonachela
 Teneisha Bonner
 Laurie Brett, actress
 Luke Brown
 Hannah Cowley, actress and director
 Paul Curran, opera director
 Chloe Dallimore, actress, singer, and dancer
 Hannah Dodd
 Luke Evans, singer and actor
 Hayley Angel Holt, actress 
 Elizabeth Hurley, actress and model
 Javine Hylton
 Cassidy Janson, actress
 Lolly, singer
 Suzanne May, actress
 Aoibhinn McGinnity, actress
 Stephen Mear CBE
 Katie Murphy
 Robyn North, singer and actress
 Tamzin Outhwaite, actress
 Juan Pablo Di Pace, actor, singer, and director 
 Matthew Pateman, singer
 Jason Pennycooke, actor and choreographer
 Nicholas Pinnock, actor
 Louis Spence
 Scarlett Strallen, actress
 Zizi Strallen, actress, singer, and dancer
 Zelda Tinska, actress
 Suzie Toase, actress
 Judi Trott, actress
 Gemma Whelan, actress and comedian

Notable teaching staff

 Mark Baldwin
 Stephanie Beacham
 Mary Goodhew
 Christopher Hampson (born 1973)
 Gary Harris
 Shobana Jeyasingh (born 1957)
 Anya Linden
 Dame Alicia Markova
 Stephen Mear (born 1964)
 Molly Molloy (1940–2016)
 Merle Park
 Michael Pink
 Elizabeth Seal
 David Wall
 Lizzie Webb
 Doreen Wells
 Belinda Wright
 Jelko Yuresha (born 1937)

Notes

External links
 London Studio Centre, official web site
Artsdepot, official web site

Contemporary dance in London
Dance schools in the United Kingdom
Education in the London Borough of Barnet
Educational institutions established in 1978